Neogyna is a genus of flowering plants in the orchid family, Orchidaceae. It contains only one known species, Neogyna gardneriana, native to Tibet, Yunnan, Bhutan, Assam, Laos, Myanmar, Nepal, Thailand, Laos and Vietnam.

See also 
 List of Orchidaceae genera

References 

 Pridgeon, A.M., Cribb, P.J., Chase, M.A. & Rasmussen, F. eds. (1999). Genera Orchidacearum 1. Oxford Univ. Press.
 Pridgeon, A.M., Cribb, P.J., Chase, M.A. & Rasmussen, F. eds. (2001). Genera Orchidacearum 2. Oxford Univ. Press.
 Pridgeon, A.M., Cribb, P.J., Chase, M.A. & Rasmussen, F. eds. (2003). Genera Orchidacearum 3. Oxford Univ. Press
 Berg Pana, H. 2005. Handbuch der Orchideen-Namen. Dictionary of Orchid Names. Dizionario dei nomi delle orchidee. Ulmer, Stuttgart

External links 

Orchids of Asia
Monotypic Epidendroideae genera
Arethuseae genera
Coelogyninae